The 1924–25 Scottish Division One season was won by Rangers by three points over nearest rival Airdrieonians. Ayr United and Third Lanark finished 19th and 20th respectively and were relegated to the 1925–26 Scottish Division Two.

League table

Results

References

Scottish Football Archive

1924–25 Scottish Football League
Scottish Division One seasons